Anne Eyre Worboys (1920 – June 2007) was a New Zealand-British writer of 40 romance and suspense novels. She also signed her novels as Annette Eyre and Anne Worboys, and under the pseudonym of Vicky Maxwell. In 1977, her novel Every Man A King ( Rendezvous with Fear) won the Romantic Novel of the Year Award by the Romantic Novelists' Association.

Biography

Personal life
Born Annette Isobel Eyre on 1920 in Auckland, New Zealand, daughter of Agnes Helen (Blair) and Thomas Edwardes Eyre. She served in the Royal New Zealand Air Force, from 1942 to 1945.

On 20 September 1946, she married Walter Brindy Worboys, and had two daughters, Carolyn and Robin.

Annette Worboys died in June 2007 in Leigh, Kent, England, UK.

Career and works
She started writing romances as Anne Eyre Worboys and Annette Eyre, after five romances under the pseudonym of Vicky Maxwell, she wrote as Anne Worboys suspense novels with some romantic elements. She won the Mary Elgin Award in 1975, and the Romantic Novel of the Year Award by the Romantic Novelists' Association in 1977 by her novel Every Man A King (a.k.a. Rendezvous with Fear).

Bibliography
Some novels are reedited under different titles or pennames.

As Anne Eyre Worboys

Single novels
 Dream of Petals Whim (1961)
 Palm Rock and Paradise (1961)
 Call from a Stranger (1962)

As Annette Eyre

Single novels
 Three Strings to a Fortune (1962)
 Visit to Rata Creek (1964)
 The Valley of Yesterday (1965)
 A Net to Catch the Wind (1966)
 Return to Bell Bird Country (1966)
 The House of Five Pines (1967)
 The River and Wilderness  (1967) a.k.a. Give Me Your Love
 A Wind from the Hill (1968)
 Thorn-Apple (1968)
 Tread Softly in the Sun (1969)
 Dolphin Bay (1970)
 The Little Millstones (1970)
 Rainbow Child (1971)
 The Magnolia Room (1972)
 Venetian Inheritance (1973)

As Vicky Maxwell

Single novels
 Chosen Child (1973)
 Flight to the Villa Mistra (1973)
 The Way of the Tamarisk (1974)
 High Hostage (1976)
 The Other Side of Summer (1977)

As Anne Worboys

Single novels
 The Lion of Delos (1974)
 Every Man a King  (1975) a.k.a. Rendezvous with Fear
 The Barrancourt Destiny (1977)
 The Bhunda Jewels (1980)
 Run, Sara, Run (1981)
 Greek Idyll (1983)
 A Kingdom for the Bold (1986) a.k.a. Aurora Rose
 China Silk (1991)
 Alice (1992)
 Village Sins (1994)
 Season of the Senses (1996)
 You Can't Sing Without Me (1996)
 Hotel Girl (1997)
 Relative Strangers (1997)
 House of Destiny (1998)
 Shifting Sands (1999)

References and sources

1920 births
2007 deaths
People from Auckland
New Zealand romantic fiction writers
RoNA Award winners
20th-century New Zealand novelists
New Zealand women novelists
Women romantic fiction writers
20th-century New Zealand women writers
Pseudonymous women writers
People from Leigh, Kent
20th-century pseudonymous writers
New Zealand emigrants to the United Kingdom